William Whitworth (23 August 1813 – 28 December 1886) was a British cotton manufacturer and politician. He was a Liberal Member of the Parliament of the United Kingdom and represented the constituency of Newry, Ireland from 1874 to 1880.

Whitworth was born in Ashton-under-Lyne, Lancashire, to Nicholas Whitworth, an iron worker maker, and Sarah Barratt, and was baptised in a Methodist church. He was a prominent local businessman, being a partner with his brother in Benjamin Whitworth and Brothers,  in the cotton merchants who by 1876 employed 1,000 people around Drogheda, Ireland. He was sheriff of Drogheda in 1869 and mayor in 1876.

He married Ruth Newton on 11 February 1847 at St Michael, Ashton-under-Lyne. They had a son, Nicholas.

Whitworth died at his home in Drogheda, after suffering a stroke, on 28 December 1886.

References

External links 
 

People from Ashton-under-Lyne
Irish Liberal Party MPs
1813 births
1886 deaths
Members of the Parliament of the United Kingdom for Newry (1801–1918)
UK MPs 1874–1880